Chen Xiangyu (born 17 February 2002) is a Chinese footballer currently playing as a forward for Shenzhen.

Career statistics

Club
.

References

2002 births
Living people
Chinese footballers
Chinese expatriate footballers
Association football forwards
FC Imabari players
Shenzhen F.C. players
Chinese expatriate sportspeople in Japan
Expatriate footballers in Japan